S2: Showbiz Sabado is a Philippine showbiz oriented talk show broadcast by ABS-CBN. It was the network's answer to GMA Network's Startalk, which was already established as a Saturday talk show. which as aired from March 22 to September 13, 2003, and was replaced by EK Channel.

History and format
In March 2003, Cristy Fermin returned to the ABS-CBN's formidable roster of hosts when she was named main host of the new Saturday gabfest "S2: Showbiz Sabado". To add more noise to the show, her erstwhile nemesis Alfie Lorenzo was named her co-host. It can be recalled that the two had a word war over the loveteam woes of Judy Ann Santos and Piolo Pascual. The warring duo was joined by Edu Manzano (Fermin's former co-host in "Showbiz Lingo Plus") as the show's "neutralizer". "S2" managed to steal "Startalk"'s loyal viewers for a while with its no-nonsense showbiz news and segments that were similar to their competitor.  However, the fun stopped in September 2003 when "S2" was axed due to management decision to reformat the Saturday afternoon time slot. Eventually, Fermin was absorbed in "The Buzz" to form a controversial trio with Boy Abunda and Kris Aquino, marking her return to the Sunday late afternoon time slot.

Hosts
Edu Manzano
Alfie Lorenzo
Cristy Fermin
Ogie Diaz

See also
 List of programs broadcast by ABS-CBN

External links
Showbiz Sabado at the Internet Movie Database

Philippine television talk shows
ABS-CBN original programming
2003 Philippine television series debuts
2003 Philippine television series endings
Entertainment news shows in the Philippines
Filipino-language television shows